Davide Plebani (born 24 July 1996) is an Italian road and track cyclist, who currently rides for UCI Continental team . Representing Italy at international competitions, Plebani competed at the 2016 UEC European Track Championships in the elimination race event.

Major results

2013
 National Junior Track Championships
1st  Madison
1st  Team pursuit
1st  Team sprint
2014
 1st  Road race, National Junior Road Championships
 6th Road race, UEC European Junior Road Championships
2016
 2nd  Team pursuit, UEC European Under-23 Track Championships
 3rd  Team sprint, National Track Championships
2018
 1st  Team time trial, National Under-23 Road Championships
2019
 European Games
2nd  Individual pursuit
2nd  Team pursuit
 3rd  Individual pursuit, UCI Track World Championships
2020
 3rd  Team relay, UEC European Road Championships

References

External links

1996 births
Living people
Italian male cyclists
Italian track cyclists
Cyclists from the Province of Bergamo
Cyclists at the 2019 European Games
European Games medalists in cycling
European Games silver medalists for Italy
21st-century Italian people